Paucartambo District may refer to:

 Paucartambo District, Pasco
 Paucartambo District, Paucartambo